The Namara inscription is a 4th century inscription in the Arabic language, making it one of the earliest. It has also been interpreted as a late version of the Nabataean Aramaic language in its transition to Arabic. It has been described by Irfan Shahid as "the most important Arabic inscription of pre-Islamic times" and by Kees Versteegh as "the most famous Arabic inscription". It is also an important source for the relationships between the Romans and the Arabs in that period.

Differences from Arabic
The inscription is written in the Nabatean Aramaic script, but there are ambiguities, as the script has only 22 signs (some with added annotations), and the Arabic dialect had 28 or 29 consonants. The script has ligatures between some letters that show a transition towards an Arabic script. Some of the terms used in the text are closer to Aramaic than Arabic; for example, it uses the Aramaic patronymic "b-r", rather than the Arabic term "b-n". However, most of the text is very close to the Classical Arabic used in the Qur'an in the 7th century.

Discovery
The location was near the boundary of the Roman Empire at the date it was carved, the Limes Arabicus of the province of Arabia Petraea. Al-Namara was later the site of a Roman fort.

History
The inscription is carved in five lines on a block of basalt, which may have been the lintel for a tomb.  It is the epitaph of a recently deceased Arab king of the Lakhmids, Imru' al-Qays ibn 'Amr, and dated securely to AD 328.  Imru' al-Qays followed his father 'Amr ibn Adi in using a large army and navy to conquer much of Iraq and the Arabian peninsula from their capital at al-Hirah.  At this time, they were vassals of the Persian Sassanids.  Raids on Iran triggered a campaign by Sassanid emperor Shapur II which conquered the Iraqi lands, and Imru' al-Qays retreated to Bahrain.  He moved to Syria to seek help from the Roman emperor Constantine. Imru' al-Qays converted to Christianity before his death in Syria and was entombed in the Syrian desert.  His conversion is mentioned in the Arab history of Hisham Ibn Al-Kalbi, an early ninth century scholar, but Irfan Shahîd notes "there is not a single Christian formula or symbol in the inscription." While Theodor Nöldeke argued against a Christian affiliation of Imru' al Qays bin 'Amr, Shahid noted that his Christian belief could be "heretical or of the Manichaean type".

The first tracing and reading of the Namara inscription was published in the beginning of the twentieth century by  René Dussaud. According to his reading, the text starts by informing the reader that this inscription was the burial monument of the king, then it introduces him and lists his achievements, and finally announces the date of his death. Many other scholars have re-read and analyzed the language of the inscription over the last century but, despite their slight differences, they all agreed with Dussaud's central viewpoint that the Namara stone was the burial monument of King Imru' al-Qays. In 1985, James A. Bellamy offered the first significantly different tracing of the inscription since Dussaud, including a breakthrough tracing correction of two highly contested words in the beginning of the third line (pointed out on Dussaud's original tracing figure as words 4 and 5). However, despite Bellamy's new important re-tracings, his Arabic reading fully agreed with the general theme of Dussaud's original reading. Bellamy's widely accepted new translation of the inscription reads: 

This is the funerary monument of Imru' al-Qays, son of 'Amr, king of the Arabs, and (?) his title of honor was Master of Asad and Nizar.
And he subdued the Asadis and they were overwhelmed together with their kings, and he put to flight Madhhij thereafter, and came
driving them to the gates of Najran, the city of Shammar, and he subdued Ma'add, and he dealt gently with the nobles
of the tribes, and appointed them viceroys, and they became phylarchs for the Romans.  And no king has equalled his achievements.
Thereafter he died in the year 223 on the 7th day of Kaslul.  Oh the good fortune of those who were his friends!

Below is Bellamy's modern Arabic translation of the Namara inscription, with brief added explanations between parenthesis: 

The mention of the date – the 7th of Kaslul in the year 223 of the Nabatean era of Bostra – securely dates his death to the 7th day of December in AD 328.

Ambiguities in translation
Parts of the translation are uncertain.  For example, early translations suggested that Imru' al-Qays was king of all the Arabs, which seems unlikely after he moved to Syria. It is also not clear whether he campaigned towards Najran while he was based at al-Hirah or after his move to Syria and, in either case, whether he did so alone or with assistance from the Sassanids or the Romans.

The inscription is now held by the Louvre Museum in Paris.

References

References
 Arabs in Antiquity: Their History from the Assyrians to the Umayyads, Jan Retso, pp. 467–
 The Arabic Language By Kees Versteegh, pp. 31–36
 Byzantium and the Arabs in the Fourth Century, Irfan Shahid, pp. 31–53
 The Early Alphabet, John F. Healey, p.54
 http://www.indiana.edu/~arabic/arabic_history.htm 
 Reading the Past: Ancient Writing from Cuneiform to the Alphabet, J. T. Hooker, p.248

328 works
4th-century inscriptions
1901 archaeological discoveries
Ancient Syria
Arabic inscriptions
Nabataean script
History of Saudi Arabia
Near East and Middle East antiquities of the Louvre